Trapania goslineri is a species of sea slug, a dorid nudibranch, a marine gastropod mollusc in the family Goniodorididae.

Distribution
This species was first described from Bahia de los Angeles, Baja California, Mexico.

Description
The length of the body attains 8 mm. This goniodorid nudibranch is white in colour, with oval black spots and a median black stripe on the body. The tips of the rhinophores, gills, lateral papillae, oral tentacles and tail are golden orange. Trapania darwini has a similar pattern of colour except that the brown patches have white spots within them.

Ecology
Trapania goslineri probably feeds on Entoprocta which often grow on sponges and other living substrata.

References

Goniodorididae
Gastropods described in 2000